Sham Ennessim (Sham Al Nassim or Sham an-Nassim; Egyptian Arabic: Sham Ennesim, ; , Shom Ennisim) is an Egyptian national festival marking the beginning of spring, as it originates from the ancient Egyptian Shemu festival. Sham Ennessim always falls on Easter Monday, which is the day after Easter, in accordance with the Coptic Orthodox Church. 

The festival has been nationally celebrated by all the Egyptians since ancient times, as it is considered a national festival in Egypt. Its history goes back to ancient Egyptian times, as it was related to the agricultural background of the ancient Egyptians, originating from Shemu. Sham Ennessim is an official holiday in modern Egypt. 

The main features of the festival are:

 People spend all day out picnicking in any space of green, public gardens, on the Nile, or at the zoo.
 Traditional food eaten on this day consists mainly of fesikh (a fermented, salted and dried grey mullet), lettuce, scallions or green onions, and lupin beans.
Coloring boiled eggs, then eating and gifting them.

History

Ancient Egypt
Sham Ennessim was first celebrated by Egyptians during the Pharaonic era (ca. 2700 BC) and they kept celebrating it during the Ptolemaic times, the Roman times, medieval times, and up to the present day. According to annals written by Plutarch during the 1st century AD, the ancient Egyptians used to offer salted fish, lettuce, and onions to their deities during the spring festival known as Shemu. Shemu (Ancient Egyptian: šmw) provides the etymology of the Coptic name "ϣⲱⲙ (ⲛ̀ⲛⲓⲥⲓⲙ) Shom (Ennisim)", and through the phono-semantic reanalysis of "En-ni-sim" as the Egyptian Arabic form of the assimilated definite article "En-" and "nesim", "Shom Ennisim" became "Sham Ennesim".

Preservance of the festival after Christianization of Egypt
After the Christianization of Egypt, the festival became associated with the other Christian spring festival, Easter. Over time, Shemu morphed into its current form and its current date. The date of Easter, and therefore of Easter Monday, is determined according to the Eastern Christian manner of calculation as used by the Coptic Orthodox Church, the largest Christian denomination in the country.

Arab Conquest of Egypt

As Egypt became Arabized, the term Shemu/Shom Ennisim found a rough phono-semantic match in Sham Ennesim, or "Smelling/Taking In the Zephyrs," which fairly accurately represents the way in which the festival is celebrated.

The Islamic calendar being lunar and thus unfixed relative to the solar year, the date of Sham Ennessim remained on the Christian-linked date. However, the Muslim Egyptians, and probably the Egyptians in general, historically calculated its date independently from Easter, they calculated it to be on the first day of the Khamaseen, which at the time happened to coincide with the day immediately following Easter. 

The Christian Egyptians have doubtless played a role in preserving the festival through their cultural agency, which was quite limited after the conversion to Islam in Egypt, but that cannot be taken to be the reason why the Muslim Egyptians collectively celebrate the festival with its exact same ancient Egyptian celebratory traditions, besides if the festival was perceived by the Muslim Egyptians to be of Christian origins or celebrated only by Christians they would have stopped celebrating it. 

For the festival to be collectively celebrated by the Muslim Egyptians it must have been retained by them amongst themselves after conversion, this is evident from the festival's documented history (see below), and from the fact that they perform the exact same ancient Egyptian celebratory traditions, as well as being evident from the fact that the festival is celebrated by Muslim Egyptians in rural areas as a tradition within families, without reference to a specific religion, and is evident from practices such as the traditional fesikh dish whose preparation is passed down within Muslim families as an occupation. 

The Egyptians evidently continued to celebrate this non-Abrahamic festival after the conversion to Islam just as they did after the conversion to Christianity. Its declaration by the Egyptian state as an official holiday was due precisely to the fact that it is a national festival celebrated by all Egyptians regardless of their religious beliefs. Besides, Sham Ennessim is not the only ancient Egyptian celebration that has survived among the Muslim Egyptians as well as among the Christian Egyptians.

In his book, published in 1834, E. W. Lane reports:

"A custom termed 'Shemm en-Neseem' [sic.] (or the Smelling of the Zephyr) is observed on the first day of the Khamaseen. Early in the morning of this day, many persons, especially women, break an onion, and smell it; and in the course of the forenoon, many of the citizens of Cairo ride or walk a little way into the country, or go in boats, generally northwards, to take the air, or, as they term it, smell the air, which, on that day, they believe to have a wonderfully beneficial effect. The greater number dine in the country, or on the river. This year (1834), they were treated with a violent hot wind, accompanied by clouds of dust, instead of the neseem; but considerable numbers, notwithstanding, went out to 'smell' it."

E. W. Lane's report of the festival indicates that even in the early 1800s the festival was non-Abrahamic in nature, and in particular non-Christian in nature; as well as indicating that the celebration was not initiated in modernity at all, regardless of when it was declared by the Egyptian state as an official holiday; and, as mentioned above, it reports that historically the date of the festival was calculated by the Muslim Egyptians, and probably by the Egyptians in general, independently from Easter, they calculated it to be on the first day of the Khamaseen, which at the time happened to coincide with the day immediately following Easter. In his book, E. W. Lane also reports:

"they [the Muslims of Egypt] calculate the period of the 'Khamaseen,' when hot southerly winds are of frequent occurrence, to commence on the day immediately following the Coptic festival of Easter Sunday."

On the pages 540–541 of the same book, E. W. Lane also lists the Christian religious festivals that the Coptic Christian celebrated following each fast, and Sham Ennesim is not at all one of them, whereas Easter is; Sham Ennesim is only reported as a festival celebrated by the Egyptians with no reference to any religion, as illustrated above, and as being observed specifically on the first day of the Khamaseen; it is important to note that the first day of the Khamaseen is not always synchronized with the day immediately following Easter, which makes Lane's report of the festival as being observed specifically on the first day of the Khamaseen quite significant.

Modern Egypt
As of today, Egyptians still celebrate Sham Ennessim on Easter Monday. As illustrated above, even though the festival falls on Easter Monday, which is the case for historical reasons, the festival is not related to Abrahamic religions. It does not have more meaning for the Christian Egyptians than it does for the Muslim Egyptians, or for any other Egyptian outside those two faiths.

See also 

 Shemu
 Nowruz
 Kha b-Nisan
 Holi
 Public holidays in Egypt
 Easter

References

Egyptian culture
Public holidays in Egypt
Holidays based on the date of Easter
April observances
May observances
Spring (season) events in Egypt